This is a list of the bridges in Norway listed by their full length above water or land.

Bridges

Bridges under consideration
Hordfast, around 5 km, in Hordaland
Sognefjord Bridge, around 4 km, in Sogn og Fjordane
Nordfjord Bridge, around 1.8 km, in Sogn og Fjordane
Sulafjord Bridge, around 4 km, in Møre og Romsdal
Julsund Bridge, around 2.0 km, in Møre og Romsdal
Halsafjord Bridge, around 2.5 km, in Møre og Romsdal
New Mjøsa Bridge, around 1.5 km, in Hedmark and Oppland
Tysfjord Bridge, around 3 km, in Nordland

References
The list compiled by Eugenio A. Merzagora which is published at The World's longest Tunnel Page.

Bridges in Norway
Bridges
Bridges by length